São Vicente is a freguesia (civil parish) and district of Lisbon, the capital of Portugal. Located in the historic center of Lisbon, São Vicente is to the east of Santa Maria Maior, south of Arroios, and west of Penha de França. São Vicente is home to numerous historic neighborhoods, including Alfama. The population in 2011 was 15,339.

History
This new parish was created with the 2012 Administrative Reform of Lisbon, merging the former parishes of São Vicente de Fora, Graça and Santa Engrácia.

Landmarks
Feira da Ladra
São Vicente de Fora Monastery
National Pantheon of Santa Engrácia
Graça Convent
Santa Apolónia Station
Monastery of the Mónicas
Miradouro Sophia de Mello Breyner Andresen

References

Parishes of Lisbon